This is a list of Bosnian patriotic songs.

{| class="wikitable sortable"
|+
!Title!!English translation!!Lyricist!!Composer!!Arranger!!Year!!scope="col" class="unsortable"|Description
|-
|"Armija BiH"||'Army of BiH'||||||||1992||song by singer Nazif Gljiva on his 1992 album Ljiljanima do pobjede; the song is known also as "Ovo je Bosna, jednom shvatite" /'This Is Bosnia, Comprehense It Once'/ (he also sings song entitled rightly "Bosna i Hercegovina" /'Bosnia and Herzegovina'/ on the same album, alongside "Armija BiH" /'Army of BiH'/, "Saraj" /'Saraj' /, Talijan", etc; he also sings "Kad se sjetim Bosne" /'When I Remember Bosnia'/, "Kosovo, Sandžak i Bosna" /'Kosovo, Sandžak and Bosnia'/, "Ne damo Bosne, ne damo Hercegovine" /'We Do Not Give Bosnia, We Do Not Give Herzegovina'/ etc.)
|-
|"Artiljerija, Bosanac bekrija"||'Artillery, Bosnian bekrija'''||||||||style="text-align:center"|1992||patriotic and wartime song by Muhamed Brkić Hamo
|-
|"Atife, Atife!"||'[heyo(h) you] Atif, Atif!'|| ||||||style="text-align:center"|1995
|song about General Atif Dudaković during a Bosnian War, sung by Safet Cimirotić
|-
|"Bosanac"||'Bosnian Man'||||||||style="text-align:center"|1984||song sung by Bosnian singer Lepa Brena and her band Slatki Greh on their 1984 album Bato, Bato|-
|"Bosanac"||'Bosnian [Man]'||||||||style="text-align:center"|1991||folk song sung by singer Enes Begović
|-
|"Bosanac"||'Bosnian [Man]'||Mirko Šenkovski||Mirko Šenkovski||Mirko Šenkovski||style="text-align:center"|2012||turbo-folk song sung by singer Elvira Rahić and DJ Deny
|-
|"Bosna"||'Bosnia'||||||||||song about the Bosnia and Herzegovina national basketball team, also used when the KK Bosna team plays games
|-
|"Bosna će vječno živjeti u nama"||'Bosnia Will Live in Us Forever'||Besim Spahić||Besim Spahić||Besim Spahić||||song sung by Bosnian musician and scientist 
|-
|"Bosna ima jedna samo"||'Bosnia [There] Is One [And] Only'||Enver Šadinlija||Ibro Mangafić, Jasmin Mangafić||Ibro Mangafić, Jasmin Mangafić||style="text-align:center"|1994||song sung by Bosnian singer Ferid Avdić
|-
|"Bosnia"||'Bosnia'||Čika Gaagara & Stihomir Klepić||Rijad Kaniža Jaddah||Toshi Domaćin & Rijad Kaniža Jaddah||style="text-align:center"|2017||funny song performed by 
|-
|"Bosno moja, jabuko u cvetu"||'My Bosnia, the Apple in Flowering'||Dobrica Erić||||||style="text-align:center"|1987||song sung by Bosnian-born Serb musician Miloš Bojanić (he also sings "Bosno moja, majko mila""Bosno moja, majko moja" /'My Bosnia, the Mother Dear[/Mine]'/, "Kad Bosanac u Bosnu se vraća" /'When Bosnian [Man] Comes Back to Bosnia'/ etc.)
|-
|"Bosnom behar probeharao"||'All over Bosnia, the Blossoms Have Blossomed'||||||||||song by Bosnian singer Edin Dervišhalidović (Dino Merlin) released in 1989
|-
|"Cijela Bosna"||'Whole Bosnia'||||||||||sevdalinka performed by singer Nusreta Kobić
|-
|"Da sam ptica"||'If I Were a Bird'||||||||||an old sevdalinka
|-
|"Domovina"||'Homeland'||||||||||song about National Day
|-
|"Haj’mo Bosno"||'Bosnia, Let's Go'||||||||||sports fan song (mainly football)
|-
|"Hej, Bosno, Bosno"||'Hey, Bosnia, Bosnia'||||||||||song sung by folk rock band Nervozni Poštar
|-
|"Ide Bosna do Brazila"||'Bosnia Goes to Brasil'||||||||||sports song sung by singer DJ Krmak (he also sings "Reprezentacija BiH" /'Representation of BiH'/, "Kad u Bosnu kom zurik" /'When I Come back to Bosnia'/, "Eros bosančeros" etc.)
|-
|"Igraj Bosno"||'Bosnia, Play'||||||||||sports fan song
|-
|"Ima Bosne ima muslimana"||'There is Bosnia There are Muslims'||||||||||patriotic song from the Bosnian War about Muslims there
|-
|"Iz srca Bosne"||'From Heart of Bosnia'||||||||style="text-align:center"|1989||song sung by Ferid Avdić
|-
|"Iznad Bosne"||'Above Bosnia'||||||||style="text-align:center"|2022||song sung by Adnan Jakupović
|-
|"Ja ti odoh majko"||'I Am Going [Away], [My] Mother'||||||||||song sung by Senad Hasić about the Bosnian War
|-
|"Jedna si jedina"||'You're One and Only'||Edin Dervišhalidović||||||||former national anthem of Bosnia and Herzegovina
|-
|"Jedna si jedina"||'You're One and Only'||||||||||song written by Milić Vukašinović and performed by Hanka Paldum
|-
|"Kad Bosnom behar probehara"||'When Cherry Blossom Cherryblossoms throughout Bosnia'||||||||style="text-align:center"|2017||song sung by Bosnian singer Ferid Avdić, presented at Ilidža Folk Music Festival
|-
|"Ko u Bosnu belaj traži"||'Who Is Looking for Trouble in Bosnia'|| ||||||||song sung by Jasmin Mangafić about the Bosnian War and the defense of Sarajevo
|-
|"Mani zemlju koja Bosnu nema"||'Ignore the Land That Does Not Have Bosnia'||||||||style="text-align:center"|1985||song sung by Bosnian singer Lepa Brena and her band Slatki Greh on their 1984 album Pile moje|-
|"Meni treba moja Bosna"||'I Need My[Mine] Bosnia'||||||||style="text-align:center"|1992||wartime song by singer Feđa Dizdarević
|-
|"Mojoj dragoj BiH"||'To My Dear BiH'||||||||||patriotic song by Drugi način about Bosnia and Herzegovina
|-
|"Nigde k’o u Bosni"||'There Is Not Anywhere Like in Bosnia'||Munevera Halebić||Munevera Halebić||Fadil Buturović||||pop-folk song by Bosnian-born Serbian singer Dejan Matić (with only backing vocals singing sole title's text)
|-
|"Nigdje tako k’o u Bosni nema"||'There Is Not Anywhere Like That Like in Bosnia'||||||||||sevdalinka by Alma Subašić (she also sings "Bosna uramljena" /'Bosnia enframed'/)
|-
|"Nije Bosna čaša vode"||'Bosnia Is Not a Glass of Water'||||||||||sevdalinka-folk song by singer Hasiba Agić
|-
|"Patriotska liga"||'The Patriotic League'||||||||||song by Rizo Hamidović, Hasiba Agić, Omer Livnjak and Hanka Paldum about Bosnian Patriotic League
|-
|"Pjesma o Bosni"||'Song about Bosnia'||||||||||song by Mirsad Šehić
|-
|"Poklon Bosni"||'Gift to Bosnia'||||||||||old sevdalinka-like song sung by Zehra Deović,  etc.
|-
|"Ponesi zastavu"||'Carry the Flag'||||||||||song sung by Mladen Vojičić about the commander of the army Dragan Vikić
|-
|"Raspjevana Bosna"||' Bosnia'||||||||style="text-align:center"|1984||song sung by Ferid Avdić
|-
|"Sarajevska raja"||'Sarajevo's People'||||||||||song by Mugdim Avdić Henda about Sarajevans
|-
|"Sinovi Bosne"||'Sons of Bosnia'||||||||||released during the Bosnian War—it references Ban Kulin and Husein Gradaščević
|-
|"Srce na teren"||'Heart to the Field'||||||||||football fans song sung by Serpico ft Halid Bešlić & Marijan Mijajlović
|-
|"Sva bol svijeta"||'All the Pain in the World'||Fahrudin Pecikoza, Edin Dervišhalidović||Edin Dervišhalidović||||||Bosnian entry in the Eurovision Song Contest 1993, performed in Bosnian by Fazla (the song's title refers to the suffering of the world caused by Bosnian War ongoing at the time)
|-
|"Šehidski rastanak"||'The Shaheed [A]Parting [Away]'||||||||||patriotic song sung by the sevdah singer Safet Isović (he also has many other popular Bosnian-patriotism songs: "Bosno moja" /'My Bosnia'/, "Bosno moja lijepa gizdava"—performed also by Predrag Gojković Cune, Nada Mamula, Beba Selimović, Zehra Deović etc.—, "Bosno moja poharana" ('My Plundered Bosnia'), "Prođoh Bosnom kroz gradove" ('I Passed through Bosnia Cities') etc.)
|-
|"Što nas ima – mašala"||'[Look,] There Is A Lot of Us – Mashallah'||||||||||song sung by Kice, Amel Ćurić and Dajra
|-
|"To su Hamze i Gazije"||'Those Are The Hamze and Gazije'|| ||||||||patriotic-folk song about the elite Hamza and Gazija forces who were part of the 505th Viteška Bužimska Brigada under Izet Nanić, widely considered the most elite forces of the Army of RBiH
|-
|"Vojnik sreće"||'Soldier of Fortune'||||||||||song sung by Bosnian singer Edin Dervišhalidović (Dino Merlin) about the heroic defense of Sarajevo during the siege
|-
|"Volio BiH"||pun for "I'd Like",  means would like to||||||||style="text-align:center"|2013||song performed by Bosnian band Dubioza kolektiv on their 2013 album Apsurdistan (they also have many other songs about BiH, often also anti-patriotic or negatively critical by subject: "Himna generacije" /'Anthem of the Generation'/, "Tranzicija" /'Transition'/, "Kokuz" /'poor guy') etc.)
|-
|"Vraćam se majci u Bosnu"||'I Come Back to [My] Mother in Bosnia'||||||||style="text-align:center"|1986||song sung by Bosnian singer Halid Bešlić on his 2013 album Otrov (he also sings "Ja se Bosni spremam" /I Prepare for Bosnia/, "Život je Bosna" /Life is Bosnia/ with Alka Vuica ft Tarkan etc.)
|-
|"Vukovi"||'Wolves'||||||||||song sung by Šerif Konjević about the Bosnian War
|-
|"Zaplakala Bosna"||'Bosnia Has Started to Cry'||||||||style="text-align:center"|1993||song sung by singer Halid Muslimović
|-
|"Zastava bosanska"||'The Flag of Bosnia'||||||||||song sung by Nedžad Esadović about  flag
|-
|-
|"Živjela Bosna"||'Long Live Bosnia'||||||||style="text-align:center"|1995||wartime song by singer Mahir Bureković
|}

See also
Army of the Republic of Bosnia and Herzegovina
List of Bosnia and Herzegovina folk songs
Territorial Defence Force of the Republic of Bosnia and Herzegovina

Notes

References

External links

Biće belaja, tekstovi.net
Bosnom behar probeharao, tekstovi.net
Sarajevska raja, tekstovi.net
Sva bol svijeta, tekstovi.net
Šehidski rastanak, tekstovi.net
Vojnik sreće, tekstovi.net
Vukovi, tekstovi.net
Živjela Bosna, tekstovi.net
Biće belaja, YouTube
Bosna, YouTube
Bosnom behar probeharao, YouTube
Ja ti odoh majko, YouTube
Mojoj dragoj BiH, YouTube
Patriotska liga, YouTube
Sarajevska raja, YouTube
Sva bol svijeta, YouTube
Šehidski rastanak, YouTube
To su Hamze i Gazije, YouTube
Vojnik sreće, YouTube
Vukovi su preko Drine, YouTube
Zastava Bosanska, YouTube
Živjela Bosna, YouTube
, historijagradacac.blogger.ba'' /arch. 1, arch. 2, alt. arch. (arch. 2)/

Patriotic songs
Bosnia
Songs about Bosnia and Herzegovina